Vem vet mest? is a Swedish game show based on the popular British show Fifteen to One. It airs on SVT2 every Monday through Friday at 7pm, with Johan Wester as host.

The game consists of three rounds with questions, starting with eight contestants of which three reach the final round. Two of the finalists from Monday through Thursday's shows all go to the Friday Final. The winner of that final receives a prize of 10 000 SEK.

The show started in August 2008 and is currently recording its 18th series.

References

External links 
 
 

Sveriges Television original programming
Swedish game shows